The 1909–10 Kentucky State Wildcats men's basketball team competed on behalf of the University of Kentucky during the 1909–10 season. The head coach was Edwin R. Sweetland, and the team finished with a final record of 4–8.

Schedule

|-
!colspan=12 style="background:#273BE2; color:white;"| Regular Season

References

Kentucky
Kentucky Wildcats men's basketball seasons
1909 in sports in Kentucky
1910 in sports in Kentucky